The following is a list of characters from the wuxia novel A Deadly Secret by Jin Yong.

Main characters
 Di Yun is the protagonist of the novel. He is framed for larceny and wrongly imprisoned. He learns the "Divine Light Skill" from Ding Dian and escapes from prison to take revenge and uncover the truth. He becomes disillusioned with the dark side of human nature after witnessing how his master and other villains attempt to seize the prized Liancheng Swordplay manual by resorting to unscrupulous means. He remains faithful to his principles and is eventually rewarded for his goodness.
 Ding Dian is Di Yun's fellow inmate in prison. He accuses Di Yun of being a spy and beats him up regularly. However, he is finally convinced that Di Yun is not a spy after Di attempts suicide, and becomes close friends with Di. He obtains the highly coveted Liancheng Swordplay manual from Mei Niansheng and becomes the target of several martial artists who are after the prized book. He is poisoned and killed by Ling Tuisi.
 Qi Fang is Qi Zhangfa's daughter and Di Yun's first love interest. She marries Wan Gui after giving up on Di Yun, whom she believes is guilty after being tricked by Wan Gui. She is killed by her husband when he suspects her of infidelity.
 Shui Sheng is Shui Dai's daughter. She is taken hostage by Grandmaster Xuedao and brought to Sichuan. She is suspicious of Di Yun initially but falls in love with him gradually as she sees his kind nature. They are forced to separate when Hua Tiegan falsely accuses her of sexual immorality in front of her fiancé. She is reunited with Di Yun at the end of the novel.
 Qi Zhangfa is Di Yun's martial arts master and Mei Niansheng's second apprentice. He murdered his master to seize the Liancheng Swordplay manual. He becomes insane after coming into contact with the cursed jewels.
 Wan Zhenshan is Mei Niansheng's first apprentice. He murders his master to seize the Liancheng Swordplay manual, and discovers the secret of the book unexpectedly when his blood soaks through a book of Tang poetry. He is murdered in cold blood by Qi Zhangfa.
 Yan Daping is Mei Niansheng's third apprentice. He collaborates with his two seniors to murder their master and seize the Liancheng Swordplay manual. He disguises himself as an old beggar and teaches Di Yun some swordplay techniques as part of a conspiracy to frame Di for larceny. He is murdered in cold blood by Qi Zhangfa.

Wan Zhenshan's associates
 Wan Gui is Wan Zhenshan's son. He lusts for Qi Fang and tricks her into believing that Di Yun is guilty while hypocritically playing the role of a good man by pretending to help Di. Qi Fang falls for his lies and gives up on Di Yun and marries him instead. He conspires with his father to seize the Liancheng Swordplay manual and kills his wife when she discovers their conspiracy. He becomes insane after coming into contact with the cursed jewels.
 Wan Zhenshan's apprentices are attracted to Qi Fang and they devise a scheme to get rid of Di Yun to win her affection. They are:
 Lu Kun
 Zhou Yin is killed by Di Yun.
 Sun Jun
 Bu Yuan
 Wu Kan is killed by Wan Zhenshan.
 Feng Tan
 Shen Cheng

Blood Saber School
 Grandmaster Xuedao is the leader of the Blood Saber School. He mistakes Di Yun for a grand-apprentice and saves him from death and teaches him martial arts. Later, he discovers that Di Yun is an impostor and attempts to kill him but unexpectedly helps Di complete his inner energy cycle. Di Yun turns the tables on him and kills him.
 Baoxiang is one of Xuedao's apprentices. He is involved in a fight with Ding Dian in prison but manages to escape. Later, he meets Di Yun by chance in a temple and attempts to kill him for food. He is outwitted and poisoned to death by Di.
 Xuedao's apprentices Shanyong and Shengdi are killed by Ding Dian in a fight in prison while trying to force him to reveal the whereabouts of the Liancheng Swordplay manual.

Luohua Liushui
The "Luohua Liushui" is a group of four martial artists from orthodox schools. They track down Grandmaster Xuedao and Di Yun to Tibet to rescue Shui Sheng, who has been taken hostage by Xuedao.

 Lu Tianshu is the oldest in the group. He is killed by Xuedao while trapped in the snow. His corpse is later eaten by Hua Tiegan.
 Hua Tiegan is the most scheming and treacherous of the four. He reveals his true colours after Xuedao is killed by Di Yun. He resorts to cannibalism and sustains himself by eating the flesh of his fallen companions. After escaping from the snowy valley, he falsely accuses Shui Sheng and Di Yun of sexual immorality in front of Shui's fiancé, causing them to be separated. He becomes insane after coming into contact with the cursed jewels.
 Liu Chengfeng is killed by Hua Tiegan unintentionally during a duel with Xuedao. His corpse is later eaten by Hua.
 Shui Dai is Shui Sheng's father. He is mortally wounded in a fight against Xuedao, and he begs Di Yun to perform a coup de grâce on him to end his suffering, which Di reluctantly did.

Others
 Mei Niansheng was Wu Liuqi's apprentice and the martial arts master of Qi Zhangfa, Wan Zhenshan and Yan Daping. He was murdered by them in their attempt to seize his Liancheng Swordplay manual. He passed the book to Ding Dian before his death.
 "Kongxincai" is the nickname of Wan Gui and Qi Fang's daughter. Her nickname is also Di Yun's childhood nickname. Her real name is not mentioned in the novel. She is raised by Di Yun and Shui Sheng after her mother dies.
 Wang Xiaofeng is Shui Sheng's cousin and one of the "Twin Sword Heroes". He attempts to save Shui Sheng from Grandmaster Xuedao but fails. He becomes insane after coming in contact with the cursed jewels.
 Ling Tuisi is a cruel and sadistic magistrate. He smears poison over his daughter's coffin to lure Ding Dian into a trap and capture him to claim the reward. He becomes insane after coming in contact with the cursed jewels.
 Ling Shuanghua was Ling Tuisi's daughter and Ding Dian's lover. She was buried alive by her father to prevent her from meeting Ding Dian.
 Juyou was Ling Shuanghua's maid. She was murdered by Ling Tuisi after he suspected her of revealing information about his daughter to Ding Dian.
 Lü Tong is a bandit chief from the Taihang Mountains.
 Taohong is Wan Zhenshan's concubine. Wan Zhenshan forces her to frame Di Yun for attempting to rape her. Before leaving the Wan family for good, she told Qi Fang the truth about Di Yun and Wan Gui.
 Ma Daming was a member of the Ten Thousand Victories Saber School. He was killed by Ding Dian.
 Geng Tianba was a martial artist killed by Ding Dian.
 Shui Fu is a servant of the Shui family.

See also
 List of organisations in wuxia fiction

Lists of Jin Yong characters
A Deadly Secret